Robert Venable is a two-time Emmy Award winning producer, mixer, engineer, and drummer for As We Ascend currently based in Nashville, Tennessee.  He is the music mixer for The Kelly Clarkson Show.

Biography
Growing up in Springdale, Arkansas, Robert Venable performed in several bands and eventually made the decision to pursue a career in music. He attended the Conservatory of Recording Arts and Sciences in Tempe, Arizona, where he graduated top of his class. While in school, Venable interned at several studios in the Phoenix metropolitan area, such as The Saltmine Studios and Phase Four, making the transition from assisting to engineering. In 2005, he was hired as head engineer at Paradise West Recording Studios in Scottsdale, Arizona. In 2009, Venable relocated to Nashville, Tennessee and worked in various studios as he built his own. Venable has mixed, engineered, and/or produced music for musicians in a variety of genres. Venable currently resides in Franklin, Tennessee and works out of Off The Wall Studios, his private recording studio, where he produces, mixes and is involved in artist development. In 2012, Venable made an appearance, portraying himself as a producer, in the pilot episode of the American musical drama television series, Nashville.

Selected works 

Venable has worked on several recordings. The following is a select list of notable recordings on which he has worked.

Affiliated studios
Current
 Off the Wall Recording Studios (Nashville, Tennessee) - 2009–present (owner)
 FIVE Studios (Nashville, Tennessee) - 2018–present (owner)

Former
Phase Four (Tempe, Arizona)
The Saltmine (Mesa, Arizona)
Paradise West Recording Studio (Scottsdale, Arizona)
The Givens House (Franklin, Tennessee)

References

External links
 
 [ Robert Venable's credits page] on AllMusic

American audio engineers
Living people
1981 births
People from Springdale, Arkansas